To Award (Posthumously) is a 1986 Soviet action film directed by Boris Grigoryev.

Plot 
The film takes place in the winter of 1945. The film tells about the front-line intelligence officer Yuri Sosnin, who ended up in the hospital as a result of shell shock. The authorities believed that he was dead and decided to reward him posthumously. After discharge, he got a job as a driver, not remembering anything, and was involved in gang warfare.

Cast 
 Aleksandr Timoshkin
 Evgeniy Leonov-Gladyshev
 Mikhail Zhigalov
 Marina Yakovleva
 Georgiy Drozd
 Vladimir Steklov		
 Yury Katin-Yartsev
 Georgiy Yumatov
 Marina Levtova

References

External links 
 

1986 films
1980s Russian-language films
Soviet action films
1986 action films